Marco Scapinello (born 18 February 1964) is an Italian ice hockey player. He competed in the men's tournament at the 1992 Winter Olympics.

References

External links
 

1964 births
Living people
Italian ice hockey players
Olympic ice hockey players of Italy
Ice hockey players at the 1992 Winter Olympics
People from Cortina d'Ampezzo
Courmaosta HC players
HC Valpellice players
Bolzano HC players
Sportspeople from the Province of Belluno